A skateboarding organization is an organization that advocates for skateboarding and the skateboarding community.

Notable skateboarding organizations 

 The Skatepark Project, formerly the Tony Hawk Foundation

 Andy Kessler Foundation

 Ben Raemers Foundation
Bronx Girls Skate
Dylan Rieder Foundation

 Look Back Library
Make Life Skate Life

 NYC Skateboard Coalition

 Pablo Ramirez Foundation

 Rob Dyrdek Foundation
 Ryan Sheckler Foundation

 Skateboarding Hall of Fame
 Skateistan

 Tim Brauch Memorial Fund
The Henry Gartland Foundation

References 

Skateboarding organizations